Jahangir (also Romanized as Jahāngīr) is a village in Zirtang Rural District, Kunani District, Kuhdasht County, Lorestan Province, Iran. At the 2006 census, its population was 7, in 5 families.

References 

Towns and villages in Kuhdasht County